Sitaram Seksaria (1892–1982) was an Indian independence activist, Gandhian, social reformer and institution builder from West Bengal, known for his contributions for the upliftment of Marwari community. He was a self-educated man. He was the founder of a number of institutions and organizations, including Shri Shikshayatan, a higher educational institution, Marwari Balika Vidyalaya, a primary school, Samaj Sudhar Samiti, a social organization and Bharatiya Bhasha Parishad, a non governmental organization. For few years he also served as a minister in Azad Hind Fauj. The Government of India awarded him the third highest civilian honor of the Padma Bhushan, in 1962, for his contributions to society. His life story has been compiled in a book, Padma Shri Sitaram Seksaria Abhinandan Granth, edited by Bhawarmal Singhi and published in 1974. He died in 1982.

References 

Recipients of the Padma Bhushan in social work
1892 births
Social workers from West Bengal
Marwari people
Gandhians
Indian social reformers
Indian independence activists from Bengal
Founders of Indian schools and colleges
1982 deaths
Social workers